The 1988 Stanley Cup playoffs, the playoff tournament of the National Hockey League (NHL), began on April 6, after the conclusion of the 1987–88 NHL season. It concluded on May 26, with the defending champion Edmonton Oilers defeating the Boston Bruins to win their second straight Stanley Cup and fourth in five years.

The Presidents' Trophy winning Calgary Flames had home ice advantage during the playoffs thanks in part to Edmonton's struggles without Wayne Gretzky, who missed a 16 games due to injury. The Oilers, who had won the Cup in three of the previous four seasons, were still thought to have a good chance at repeating with Gretzky's return. The clash between the Flames and Oilers in the Smythe Division Final was highly anticipated.

The New Jersey Devils made the playoffs for the first time since their move from Denver, winning in overtime at Chicago Stadium on the season's final day to edge the New York Rangers for the Patrick Division's fourth spot. This was only the second time they made the playoffs including their Colorado and Kansas City days.

The 1988 playoffs most notable moment was the cancellation of game four of the finals in Boston after fog issues, a result of high heat and the subsequent building power outage resulted in the game being canceled outright with the result not counting, yet the league retained player stats from the game. The series would move directly on to Edmonton. Gretzky would go on to set NHL playoff records with 31 assists in 18 games and 13 points in the Stanley Cup Finals.

Playoff seeds

The following teams qualified for the playoffs:

Prince of Wales Conference

Adams Division
 Montreal Canadiens, Adams Division champions, Prince of Wales Conference regular season champions – 103 points
 Boston Bruins – 94 points
 Buffalo Sabres – 85 points
 Hartford Whalers – 77 points

Patrick Division
 New York Islanders, Patrick Division champions – 88 points
 Washington Capitals – 85 points (38 wins, 9 points head-to-head vs. Philadelphia)
 Philadelphia Flyers – 85 points (38 wins, 5 points head-to-head vs. Washington)
 New Jersey Devils – 82 points

Clarence Campbell Conference

Norris Division
 Detroit Red Wings, Norris Division champions – 93 points
 St. Louis Blues – 76 points
 Chicago Blackhawks – 69 points
 Toronto Maple Leafs – 52 points (the lowest point total for any playoff qualifier, minimum 70 games played)

Smythe Division
 Calgary Flames, Smythe Division champions, Clarence Campbell Conference regular season champions, Presidents' Trophy winners – 105 points
 Edmonton Oilers – 99 points
 Winnipeg Jets – 77 points
 Los Angeles Kings – 68 points

Playoff bracket

Division Semifinals

Prince of Wales Conference

(A1) Montreal Canadiens vs. (A4) Hartford Whalers

This was the third playoff series between these two teams. Montreal won both previous meetings, including their most recent meeting in seven games in the 1986 Adams Division Finals.
Montreal was the best team in the Wales Conference during the regular season.

(A2) Boston Bruins vs (A3) Buffalo Sabres

This was the third playoff series between these two teams. Boston won both prior meetings. They last met in the 1983 Adams Division Finals, in which Boston won in seven games.

(P1) New York Islanders vs. (P4) New Jersey Devils

This was the first and to date only playoff series between these two teams. This was the first time that a team representing the state of New Jersey qualified for the Stanley Cup playoffs. This was the first ever playoff series victory for the Scouts/Rockies/Devils franchise. This would be the last playoff series until the 2019 Eastern Conference First Round that the Islanders held home-ice advantage.

(P2) Washington Capitals vs. (P3) Philadelphia Flyers

This was the second playoff series between these two teams. Washington won the only previous meeting in a three-game sweep in the 1984 Patrick Division Semifinals.

Washington overcame a 3–1 series deficit to advance to the Patrick Division Finals for the third time in five years. Game seven ended when Dale Hunter scored at 5:57 of the first overtime period to complete the Capitals' comeback.

Clarence Campbell Conference

(N1) Detroit Red Wings vs. (N4) Toronto Maple Leafs

This was the 22nd playoff series between these two teams. Toronto led 11–10 in previous playoff meetings. This was a rematch of the previous year's Norris Division Finals,  which Detroit won in seven games.

Game six in Maple Leaf Gardens was future Hall of Famer Borje Salming's final playoff game in the NHL.

(N2) St. Louis Blues vs. (N3) Chicago Blackhawks

This was the fifth playoff series between the Blackhawks and Blues. Chicago won all four previous meetings, including their most recent meeting 3–1 in the 1983 Norris Division Semifinals.

(S1) Calgary Flames vs. (S4) Los Angeles Kings

This was the third playoff series between these two teams, but the first since the Flames relocated from Atlanta. Los Angeles won both previous meetings, including their most recent meeting 2–1 in the 1977 Preliminary Round.

(S2) Edmonton Oilers vs. (S3) Winnipeg Jets

This was the fifth playoff series between the Jets and Oilers. Edmonton won all four previous meetings. This was a rematch of the previous year's Smythe Division Finals,  which Edmonton won in a four-game sweep.

Division Finals

Prince of Wales Conference

(A1) Montreal Canadiens vs. (A2) Boston Bruins

This was the 23rd playoff series between these two teams. Montreal led 20–2 in previous playoff series meetings. This was the fifth year in a row that these team met in the playoffs. Montreal had defeated Boston in the Division Semifinals the four previous seasons.

This was Boston's first playoff series victory against Montreal since the 1943 Stanley Cup Semifinals. Boston had lost the previous 18 playoff series between these two teams, an NHL record for most consecutive playoff series defeats to one team.

(P2) Washington Capitals vs. (P4) New Jersey Devils

This was the first playoff series between these two teams.

Patrik Sundström's eight-point effort in game three (3 goals, 5 assists) set a new Stanley Cup playoff record for most points in a single game.

Clarence Campbell Conference

(N1) Detroit Red Wings vs. (N2) St. Louis Blues

This was the second playoff series meeting between these two teams. St. Louis won the only previous meeting 3–1 in the 1984 Norris Division Semifinals.

(S1) Calgary Flames vs. (S2) Edmonton Oilers

This was the fourth playoff series meeting between these two teams. Edmonton won two of the previous three meetings. Calgary won the most recent meeting in seven games in the 1986 Smythe Division Finals.

In the Battle of Alberta the Oilers would claim the first sweep of the playoffs.  In game two Wayne Gretzky scored the overtime winning goal short-handed.

Conference Finals

Prince of Wales Conference Final

(A2) Boston Bruins vs. (P4) New Jersey Devils

This was the first playoff meeting between these two teams.

This series featured the infamous confrontation between Devils coach Jim Schoenfeld and referee Don Koharski after Game 3, when, during an argument in the tunnel after the game, Koharski tripped and fell, accusing Schoenfield of pushing him. Schoenfield famously responded, "Good, 'cause you fell you fat pig!" Then, he yelled "Have another doughnut! Have another doughnut!" The incident has since become part of NHL lore.

Schoenfeld was suspended by NHL president John Ziegler for Game four, but the Devils received an injunction from the New Jersey Supreme Court, allowing Schoenfeld to coach the fourth game. In protest, the officials scheduled to work that game in the Meadlowands refused to take the ice, forcing the NHL to scramble for amateur officials to call the game. The injunction was lifted, the league conducted a proper hearing, Schoenfeld served his suspension during Game five in the Boston Garden, and the League officials returned to work.

Clarence Campbell Conference Final

(S2) Edmonton Oilers vs. (N1) Detroit Red Wings

This was the second playoff meeting between these two teams and was a rematch of the previous year's Clarence Campbell Conference Final which Edmonton won in five games.

Stanley Cup Finals

This was the first Finals meeting between these two teams.

The original game four is well known for the high heat resulting in fog that interfered with the game and a subsequent power outage that caused the game to be canceled at 16:37 of the second period. The game results didn't count, but players were able to retain their stats counting towards their playoff records, as per NHL rules. The series moved on to Edmonton, thus allowing the Oilers to win the Cup at home at Northlands Coliseum and complete the sweep.

Player statistics

Skaters
These are the top ten skaters based on points.

Goaltenders
This is a combined table of the top five goaltenders based on goals against average and the top five goaltenders based on save percentage, with at least 420 minutes played. The table is sorted by GAA, and the criteria for inclusion are bolded.

See also
List of Stanley Cup champions

Further reading
CBC Archives 1988 Stanley Cup Finals Blackout in Boston

References

playoffs
Stanley Cup playoffs